The Pas station is a railway station in The Pas, Manitoba, Canada. The station is served by Via Rail's Winnipeg–Churchill train and the Keewatin Railway train to Pukatawagan, which is also operated by Via.

The multi-coloured -storey brick station building was built in 1928. The railway station was designated a historic site in 1992.

Footnotes 

Via Rail stations in Manitoba
Designated Heritage Railway Stations in Manitoba
Canadian Register of Historic Places in Manitoba
Railway stations in Canada opened in 1928
1928 establishments in Manitoba
Transport in The Pas